Sidi Garidi Cemetery is a cemetery in the commune of Kouba in Algeria. The name related to Sidi Garidi.

Notable interments

Abderrachid Boukerzaza

Brahim Boushaki

Hacène Lalmas

Mohamed Missouri

Nabil Hemani
Nouria Kazdarli

Gallery

See also
Cemeteries of Algiers

References

1730 establishments
Cemeteries in Algeria
Buildings and structures in Algiers
18th-century establishments in Africa